Ab Bid-e Heygun (also romanized as Āb Bīd-e Heygūn; also known as Āb Bīd) is a village in Dehdasht-e Sharqi Rural District, in the Central District of Kohgiluyeh County, Kohgiluyeh and Boyer-Ahmad Province, Iran. As of the 2006 census, its population was 68, in 14 families.

References 

Populated places in Kohgiluyeh County